The Rio de Janeiro arboreal rat (Phaenomys ferrugineus) is a rodent species from South America. It is found in Brazil.  It is the only species in the genus Phaenomys.

References

Thomasomyini
Mammals described in 1894
Taxa named by Oldfield Thomas